Isaac Parrish (March 1804August 9, 1860) was an American lawyer and politician who served two non-consecutive terms as a U.S. Representative from Ohio in the mid-19th century.

Early life and career  
Born near St. Clairsville, Belmont County, Ohio, in March 1804, Parrish resided in Cambridge, Guernsey County, Ohio.
He studied law.
He was admitted to the bar and practiced.
He served as prosecuting attorney of Guernsey County in 1833.
He served as a member of the State house of representatives in 1837.

Congress 
Parrish was elected as a Democrat to the Twenty-sixth Congress (March 4, 1839 – March 3, 1841).
He was an unsuccessful candidate for reelection in 1840 to the Twenty-seventh Congress.

Parrish was elected to the Twenty-ninth Congress (March 4, 1845 – March 3, 1847).
He was not a candidate for renomination in 1846.

Later career and death 
He resumed the practice of law and his former business pursuits in Sharon.
He was also interested in the real estate business and engaged in freighting by steamboat on the Mississippi River.
He established the Harrison County Flag, published at Calhoun, Iowa.

He died in Parrish City, Iowa, August 9, 1860.
He was interred in Calhoun Cemetery in Calhoun, Iowa.

Sources

People from St. Clairsville, Ohio
People from Cambridge, Ohio
1860 deaths
County district attorneys in Ohio
Democratic Party members of the Ohio House of Representatives
1804 births
19th-century American politicians
Democratic Party members of the United States House of Representatives from Ohio